Leila Pinheiro (born October 16, 1960 in Belém) is a Brazilian Bossa Nova singer, pianist and composer. Her self-titled debut album had the guest performances of Tom Jobim, João Donato, Ivan Lins, Francis Hime, and Toninho Horta, and she later went on to perform with artists such as Zimbo Trio, Pat Metheny, Baden Powell and Toquinho.

Discography

As a leader

As a featured artist 
 2016 - Suite Três Rios - Dan Costa (Composer)

DVDs 
 2001 - Mais Coisas do Brasil - ao vivo
 2007 - Nos Horizontes do Mundo - ao vivo
 2007 - Agarradinhos (Leila Pinheiro and Roberto Menescal)

References

 [ Leila Pinheiro] at allmusic

Brazilian composers
1960 births
Living people
Bossa nova singers
Bossa nova pianists
Brazilian women pianists
Brazilian women composers
People from Belém
Universal Music Group artists
Verve Records artists
20th-century composers
21st-century composers
20th-century pianists
21st-century pianists
20th-century Brazilian women singers
20th-century Brazilian singers
21st-century Brazilian women singers
21st-century Brazilian singers
20th-century women composers
21st-century women composers
Women in Latin music
20th-century women pianists
21st-century women pianists